Madleen Wilder  (born 6 July 1980 in Potsdam) is a German women's international footballer who plays as a defender. She is a member of the Germany women's national football team. She was part of the team at the UEFA Women's Euro 2001. On club level she plays for 1. FFC Turbine Potsdam in Germany.

References

1980 births
Living people
German women's footballers
Germany women's international footballers
Sportspeople from Potsdam
Women's association football defenders
UEFA Women's Championship-winning players
Footballers from Brandenburg